Mikhail Vasilyevich Sagin (born 3 October 1962) is a former Russian football player.

External links
 

1962 births
Living people
Soviet footballers
FC Baltika Kaliningrad players
FC Dynamo Stavropol players
SKA Odesa players
Russian footballers
FC Rostov players
Russian Premier League players
Association football forwards
Association football midfielders